The ABA Club Championship was an Asian basketball tournament for professional clubs, organised by the Asian Basketball Association (ABA) under Dr. Carl Men Ky Ching. The ABA is not to be confused with FIBA Asia which Dr. Ching had also once presided. The tournament was first held in 1992. It was named Asian Basketball Super League from 1999 to 2001, and came to a climax in 2000. The tournament was suspended between 2002 and 2006, and has been held annually in China between 2007 and 2013. Unlike the FIBA Asia Champions Cup of today, most of ABA Club Championship's participants were from the Far East.

Summary

See also 
 FIBA Asia
 FIBA Asia Champions Cup

References 

Basketball club competitions in Asia